The Hambak Gim clan is a Korean clan. Their Bon-gwan is in Gimhae, Cheongdo County. , this clan has a membership of 4,579. He was granted his surname from Seonjo, the king of Korea, as with the Urok Kim clan.

See also 
 Korean clan names of foreign origin
 Urok Kim clan
 Mangjeol
 Hwangmok
 Hwasun Song clan
 Songjin Jeup clan

References

External links 
 

 
Korean clan names of Japanese origin
Clans based in Cheongdo